Las tontas no van al cielo (English title: Dumb Girls Don't Go to Heaven, Lit: Bimbos Don't Go to Heaven) is a Mexican telenovela produced by Rosy Ocampo for Televisa in 2008.

On 11 February 2008, Canal de las Estrellas started broadcasting Las tontas no van al cielo weekdays at 8:00pm, replacing Yo amo a Juan Querendón. The last episode was broadcast on 22 August 2008 with Un gancho al corazón replacing it the following day.

Jacqueline Bracamontes, Jaime Camil and Valentino Lanús starred as protagonists, while Karla Álvarez, Fabiola Campomanes and Sabine Moussier starred as antagonists. The leading actors were Manuel "Flaco" Ibáñez, Silvia Mariscal, Julio Alemán and Ana Bertha Espín.

Plot 
Cándida "Candy" Morales Alcalde is a beautiful young girl filled with dreams and hopes for her future. At her 15th birthday party she meets the man of her dreams – Patricio Molina Lizárraga, who later becomes her husband. On the day of their wedding, Candy finds out that Patricio cheated on her with her sister, Alicia. Angry and hurt, she leaves him and goes to Guadalajara with her uncle, Manuel. She decides to fake her death to her family and Patricio to start a new life. Later she realizes that she is pregnant with Patricio's child. Her newborn son is what gives her hope for the future, and he becomes the reason she lives.

Meanwhile, Santiago López Carmona, a plastic surgeon, tries to build a family with his career-driven wife, Paulina. She leaves him with their daughter, Rocio, and he becomes highly disappointed in love. Therefore, he begins to sleep with many different women without making any emotional connection with them. When he meets Candy, he is determined to romance her in order to take her to bed, but he quickly discovers how special she really is and falls in love with her.

Though they first dislike each other, as time passes, Candy takes a liking to Santiago and attempts to have a relationship with him. However, this becomes difficult when their children and their exes do everything in their power to prevent their happiness.

Cast

Main
Jaime Camil as Santiago "Santy" López Carmona
Jacqueline Bracamontes as Cándida "Candy" Morales Alcalde de Molina
Valentino Lanús as Patricio "Pato" Molina Lizárraga
Sabine Moussier as Marissa de la Parra
Fabiola Campomanes as Alicia Morales Alcalde
Karla Álvarez as Paulina "Pau" Cervantes de López-Carmona
Julio Alemán as Arturo Molina
Manuel "Flaco" Ibáñez as Manuel "Meño" Morales
Ana Bertha Espín as Gregoria "Goya" Alcalde Vda. de Morales
Silvia Mariscal as Isabel Vda. de López Carmona

Supporting
Mauricio Herrera as Jaime Martínez
Rosángela Balbó as Margarita Lizárraga de Molina
Alejandro Ibarra as Eduardo All
Andrea Torre as Soledad Romero
Jackie Garcia as Rosario "Chayo" de All
Carlos de la Mota as Raúl de la Parra
Luis Manuel Ávila as Carlos "Frijolito" Zamora
Reynaldo Rossaldo as Antonio "Toño" "Lentejita"
Julio Vega as Donato
Raquel Garza as Hortensia
Lili Brillanti as Tina
Gaby Platas as Bárbara
Ginny Hoffman as Cecilia
Erik Guecha as Carlo
Christina Pastor as Lourdes "Lulú" Robledo
Violeta Isfel as Lucía López-Carmona
Eleazar Gómez as Charlie Morales
Robin Vega as Salvador "Chava" Molina Morales
Diego Ramirez as Alberto "Beto" Molina Romero
Mariana Lodoza as Rocío "Chio" López-Carmona Cervantes
Ivette Cordovez as Paty

Special participation
Allisson Lozz as Milagros Belmonte Ramos
Laura Flores as Luciana Arango
Arlette Pacheco as Laura de Morales
Agustín Arana as Mario Landazuri
Ximena Herrera as Irene
Marco Uriel as Héctor
Rafael del Villar as Jorge
Viviana Ramos as Evangelina
Mario Casillas as Clemente Morales
Georgina Domínguez as Elianis

Awards

References

External links

 at esmas.com 

2008 telenovelas
Mexican telenovelas
2008 Mexican television series debuts
2008 Mexican television series endings
Spanish-language telenovelas
Television shows set in Mexico City
Television shows set in Acapulco
Televisa telenovelas